Eucalyptus resinifera, commonly known as red mahogany or red messmate, is a species of medium-sized to tall tree endemic to coastal areas of eastern Australia. It has rough, stringy or fibrous bark on the trunk and branches, lance-shaped adult leaves, flower buds in groups of between seven and eleven, white flowers and hemispherical, conical or cup-shaped fruit.

Description
It has rough, stringy or fibrous, reddish brown bark in long strips on the trunk and branches. Flowering occurs in December and the flowers are white.

Taxonomy and naming
Eucalyptus resinifera was first formally described in 1790 by James Edward Smith in John White's book, Journal of a Voyage to New South Wales, from material collected by White at Port Jackson. The specific epithet (resinifera) is from the Latin resiniferus meaning "resin-bearing".

In 1990, Lawrie Johnson and Ken Hill described two subspecies, and the names have been accepted by the Australian Plant Census:
 Eucalyptus resinifera subsp. hemilampra (F.Muell.) L.A.S.Johnson & K.D.Hill (originally described by Ferdinand von Mueller as Eucalyptus hemilampra);
 Eucalyptus resinifera Sm. subsp. resinifera.

The two subspecies differ in the length of the operculum. In subspecies resinifera it is less than three times as long as the floral cup and in species hemilampra more than three times as long.

Distribution and habitat
Red mahogany is found in coastal areas from Nowra in New South Wales to Gladstone in Queensland, with disjunct populations further north as far as Coen. It grows in forest on flats, valleys and gentle slopes, preferring soils of medium to high fertility. Subspecies hemilampra occurs between Taree and Gladstone, whilst subspecies resinifera occurs between Nowra and Taree, then disjunctly north of Gladstone.

Ecology
Red mahogany has wildlife value as a food tree for koalas.

Uses 
The timber of red mahogany is well regarded for its high quality, being very hard and heavy, and having dark-red heartwood. It has multiple uses including flooring, panelling, cladding, boat building, railroad ties and general construction. It is also a good choice for making poles and charcoal.

E. resinifera has been exported for use as a crop plant on plantations in varying locales in Africa (Madagascar, South Africa and Zimbabwe), Western Europe (Italy and Portugal), and the U.S. (Hawaiian Islands).

References 

resinifera
Myrtales of Australia
Flora of New South Wales
Flora of Queensland